WCSB may refer to:

 WCSB (FM), a radio station (89.3 FM) licensed to Cleveland, Ohio, United States, which has identified as WCSB since 1976
 Western Canadian Sedimentary Basin
 Western conifer seed bug
 Wakulla County School Board